Loewenstein and Sons Hardware Building, also known as the Loewenstein Building or Rite Aid Building, is a historic commercial structure located at Charleston, West Virginia. It was designed by the Columbus, Ohio architectural firm of Yost & Packard.

The  by  building is distinguished by a central bay of oriel windows on its Capitol Street facade. Palladian windows are located on both sides of this central bay on the fifth floor. S.S. Kresge operated a variety store in the building from 1927 to 1971.

It was listed on the National Register of Historic Places in 1985.

References

Commercial buildings completed in 1900
Buildings and structures in Charleston, West Virginia
Commercial buildings on the National Register of Historic Places in West Virginia
Palladian Revival architecture in West Virginia
National Register of Historic Places in Charleston, West Virginia
Victorian architecture in West Virginia
Yost and Packard buildings
Art Nouveau architecture in the United States
Art Nouveau retail buildings